Thomas Richard Joseph (born July 16, 1991) is an American professional baseball coach and former first baseman, currently the hitting coach for the Binghamton Rumble Ponies. 

High school
Joseph attended Horizon High School in Scottsdale, Arizona, where he played for the school's baseball team. A first baseman in his first three years of high school, Joseph became a catcher in his senior year.  In 2009, he was named the Arizona high school player of the year.

Playing career

Minor Leagues
The San Francisco Giants selected Joseph in the second round, with the 55th overall selection, of the 2009 Major League Baseball Draft as a catcher and first baseman. In 2010, Joseph was named a South Atlantic League all-star for his performance with the Augusta GreenJackets. He suffered a concussion during the 2010 season. The Giants invited Joseph to spring training in 2011. Joseph played for the Richmond Flying Squirrels of the Class AA Eastern League in 2012, and appeared in the All-Star Futures Game that year.

Philadelphia Phillies
During the 2012 season, the Giants traded Joseph with Nate Schierholtz and Seth Rosin to the Philadelphia Phillies for Hunter Pence. The Phillies assigned Joseph to the Reading Fightin Phils of the Eastern League. After the 2012 season, he was assigned to the Peoria Javelinas of the Arizona Fall League (AFL), and participated in the AFL Rising Stars Game.

Joseph played in only 36 games in the 2013 season due to a concussion. The Phillies added him to their 40-man roster on November 20, 2013, to protect him from being exposed to the Rule 5 draft. Joseph suffered a wrist injury in 2014 which limited him to 27 games played, and required season ending surgery. Joseph began the 2015 season with the Lehigh Valley IronPigs of the Class AAA International League, where he suffered his third concussion in May 2015. Due to the concussions, the Phillies converted him into a first baseman.

After posting a .347 average and a .611 slugging percentage in the first 27 games of the 2016 season, the Phillies promoted Joseph from Lehigh Valley to the major leagues on May 13, 2016. He hit his first major league home run on May 17. On June 1, Phillies manager Pete Mackanin announced his plans to give Joseph extended playing time at first base and keep the slumping veteran Ryan Howard on the bench. Joseph officially supplanted Howard as the everyday first baseman on June 10 and punctuated the move by hitting his sixth and seventh home runs of the season that day, with Mackanin calling Joseph "the real deal".

In 2017, Joseph batted .240 with a .289 on-base percentage. After the 2017 season, the Phillies acquired Carlos Santana to play first base.

On March 12, 2018, Joseph was designated for assignment.

Texas Rangers
On March 19, 2018, the Texas Rangers claimed Joseph off waivers. He was designated for assignment on March 29. He cleared waivers and was outrighted to the Class AA Frisco RoughRiders. He declared free agency on October 2.

LG Twins
On November 28, 2018, Joseph signed a one-year, $1 million contract with the LG Twins of the KBO League.

Joseph was waived by the Twins on July 9, 2019.

Boston Red Sox
On August 5, 2019, Joseph signed a minor league contract with the Boston Red Sox, and was assigned to the Gulf Coast League Red Sox.

He became a minor-league free agent on November 2, 2020.

Team Texas
In July 2020, Joseph signed to play for Team Texas of the Constellation Energy League (a makeshift 4-team independent league created as a result of the COVID-19 pandemic) for the 2020 season.

Coaching career
On March 8, 2021, Joseph was announced as the hitting coach for the St. Lucie Mets, the Low-A affiliate of the New York Mets.
On January 6, 2022, Joseph was announced as the hitting coach for the Binghamton Rumble Ponies, the AA affiliate of the New York Mets.

References

External links

Tommy Joseph at Baseball Gauge

1991 births
Living people
American expatriate baseball players in South Korea
Augusta GreenJackets players
Baseball catchers
Baseball players from Phoenix, Arizona
Clearwater Threshers players
Estrellas Orientales players
Florida Complex League Phillies players
Gulf Coast Red Sox players
KBO League first basemen
Lehigh Valley IronPigs players
Leones del Escogido players
American expatriate baseball players in the Dominican Republic
LG Twins players
Major League Baseball first basemen
Peoria Javelinas players
Philadelphia Phillies players
Reading Fightin Phils players
Reading Phillies players
Richmond Flying Squirrels players
San Jose Giants players